SS Cape Mendocino (T-AKR-5064) is a steam turbine powered heavy-lift  SEABEE barge carrier, one of two ships of her type in the Military Sealift Command's Ready Reserve Force. 

She was originally built as the Maritime Administration type (C8-S-82a) hull SS Doctor Lykes, under a MARAD contract (for commercial use with the Lykes Brothers Steamship Company. She was laid down on 15 July 1970, at the General Dynamics Quincy Shipbuilding Division, MA, launched on 10 October 1971, and delivered for service on 21 June 1972. 

Cape Mendocino is used in various tasks for the US military in heavy transport of goods in various theaters of action.  In October 2011 she was moved from the James River Reserve Fleet to the Beaumont Reserve Fleet.

See also
  sister ship

External links
 
 Vehicle Cargo Ships - AKR

References

 

Cape M-class heavy lift ships
1971 ships
Ships built in Quincy, Massachusetts